The Marya are a tribe in western Eritrea. They are mostly shepherds and farmers they inhabit the middle valley of the Anseba River in the Keren District. There split into two clans: the Marya qeyih and the marya tselam. They are related to the Mensa, Hazo and Tora peoples, and form a subgroup of the Tigre people.

References 

Ethnic groups in Eritrea
Anseba Region